was the fiftieth of the sixty-nine stations of the Nakasendō connecting Edo with Kyoto in Edo period Japan. It is located in former Mino Province in what is now part of the town of Mitake, Kani District, Gifu Prefecture, Japan

History
In the early Edo period, the system of post stations on the Nakasendō was formalized by the Tokugawa shogunate in 1602; however, Fushimi-juku was to established until 92 years later when changes in the flow of the Kiso River shifted the location where ferries could cross further upstream. It originally prospered as the place where payments of land tax in the form of rice were loaded onto barges and shipped down to the coast towards Nagoya. Fushimi was also the starting point of another side road named the Uwa-Kaidō which linked the Nakasendō and the Tōkaidō at Nagoya. However, due to its proximity to  nearby post towns, such as Mitake-juku and Ōta-juku, the post station remained relatively small. 

Fushimi-juku was 380.3 kilometers from Edo.

Today, there is nothing remaining of Fushimi-juku except for a couple of commemorative monuments. The honjin was destroyed in a fire in 1848 and never rebuilt. Construction of modern Japan National Route 1 through the old post town meant that any old buildings surviving were demolished.

Fushimi-juku in The Sixty-nine Stations of the Kiso Kaidō
Utagawa Hiroshige's ukiyo-e print of Fushimi-juku dates from 1835 -1838. The print's composition is centered on a very large cypress tree, under which a group of pilgrims are resting and taking a meal. In front are two samurai with long spears, possibly the forerunners of a daimyō procession, one of who is adjusting his sandal. To the left approaches a doctor, with a parasol, with a single sword and red furoshiki with medical supplies indicating his profession and status. To the right is a party of three blind female musicians, bearing shamisen, who appear to be making for the post station, which is show in the very far left distance.

Neighboring Post Towns
Nakasendō
Mitake-juku - Fushimi-juku - Ōta-juku
Uwa Kaidō (connects the Nakasendō with Nagoya Castle)
Fushimi-juku (starting location) - Dota-juku (土田宿)

References

External links

Hiroshige Kiso-Kaido series
Fushimi-juku on Kiso Kaido Road
Gifu Nakasendo Guide

Notes

Stations of the Nakasendō
Post stations in Gifu Prefecture
Mitake, Gifu
Mino Province